"Blue Boy" is a song written by Boudleaux Bryant, sung by Jim Reeves, and released on the RCA Victor label. In July 1958, it peaked at No. 2 on Billboards country and western jockey chart. It spent 22 weeks on the charts and was also ranked No. 10 on Billboards 1958 year-end country and western chart.  On the Hot 100, "Blue Boy" peaked at No. 45.

The song was originally recorded by Anita Carter as "Blue Doll"  b/w "Go Away Johnnie" on Cadence 1333, released August, 1957.  The single did not chart.

The song has been included on multiple compilation albums, including He'll Have to Go & Other Hits (1960), The Best of Jim Reeves (1964), The Unforgettable Jim Reeves (1976), Country U.S.A.: 1958 (1989), and The Essential Jim Reeves (1995).

See also
 Billboard year-end top 50 country & western singles of 1958

References

Jim Reeves songs
1958 songs